Jamayne Isaako (born 5 June 1996) is an Australian-based New Zealand professional rugby league footballer who plays as a er and  for the Dolphins in the National Rugby League. 
 
He previously played for the Gold Coast Titans and the Brisbane Broncos in the NRL. He has also played for both New Zealand and Samoa at international level.

Background
Isaako was born in Christchurch, New Zealand and is of Samoan and Tokelau descent.

He played junior rugby league for the Aranui Eagles before being signed by the Cronulla-Sutherland Sharks in their youth team.

Playing career

Early career
In 2014 and 2015, Isaako played at five-eighth for the Cronulla-Sutherland Sharks' NYC team. In May 2015, he played  for the Junior Kiwis against the Junior Kangaroos in their 34-20 loss at Cbus Super Stadium. In 2016, Isaako joined the Brisbane Broncos Under 20's team in round 9. In May 2016, he played for the Junior Kiwis against the Junior Kangaroos for a second consecutive year.

2017
In 2017, Isaako graduated to the Broncos Queensland Cup team, Souths Logan Magpies. During the season, Isaako's form for the Magpies prompted Broncos coach Wayne Bennett to debut him in NRL round 19 against the Newcastle Knights, starting at fullback in the 34-22 win at Hunter Stadium.
 This was Isaako's only appearance for the Broncos for the 2017 NRL season. However, he continued in the Queensland Cup and was named as fullback in the Intrust Super Cup team of the season.

2018
In round 1 against the St George Illawarra Dragons in the 2018 season opening match, Isaako starred as a winger for the Broncos in their 34-12 loss at Jubilee Stadium. In round 3, the Broncos defeated the Wests Tigers 9-7 at Campbelltown Stadium. In total, Isaako kicked 4 penalty goals, including 1 in golden point extra time, and a field goal. . In round 6 against the New Zealand Warriors, Isaako scored his first two NRL tries in the Broncos 27-18 win at Mt Smart Stadium. In Round 11 against the Sydney Roosters, Isaako scored 2 tries and kicked 4 goals, 1 of the tries came from nothing after he was pressured from Roosters defenders after an attempt to kick a field goal, so he stepped around defenders in a razzle dazzle fashion and scored a magnificent try to win the match 28-22 for the Broncos with two minutes to go at Suncorp Stadium. 

On 24 June 2018, Isaako made his international debut for New Zealand against England in the historical test match set in Denver, USA, starting on the wing and kicking 3 goals in the 36-18 loss at Mile High Stadium.

After showing excellent form for the Broncos in the NRL, Isaako started at fullback during rounds 19-21, and the incumbent fullback Darius Boyd was shifted to centre. Isaako showed some success as a fullback but went back to the wing for the rest of season. On 19 July 2018, Isaako extended his contract with the Broncos to the end of the 2024 season, after rejecting a rich offer from the Sydney Roosters because he ultimately believed the Broncos offered the best opportunity to pursue his long-term positional goal of playing fullback. Isaako finished his exciting 2018 NRL season with him playing in all of the Broncos 25 matches, scoring 11 tries and kicking 97 goals, being the club's highest point scorer with 239 points. On 26 September 2018, at the 2018 Dally M Awards, Isaako received the Rookie of the Year award and his magnificent match winning try against the Sydney Roosters in round 11 was named as the Try of the Year. 

On 1 October 2018, Isaako was named in the New Zealand squad for their tour of Great Britain. He played in 1 match, which was the last of the 3 matches against England, playing on the wing in the 34-0 win at Elland Road in Leeds.

2019
With uncharacteristic errors creeping into his game as the Broncos struggled with a 2-6 start leading up to the round 9 Magic Round match against the Manly-Warringah Sea Eagles, Isaako as wing and James Roberts as centre were dropped from the team for defensive and handling issues. Isaako returned to his wing spot the following week against the 2018 premiers, the Sydney Roosters, and kicked 3 goals in the much needed 15-10 win at Suncorp Stadium.

2020
Isaako played only ten games for Brisbane in the 2020 NRL season. Due to his father's death in New Zealand and COVID-19 quarantine restrictions, he was unable to return to Australia and play for the second half of the season.

2021
In round 8 of the 2021 NRL season, Isaako scored two tries and kicked five goals as Brisbane came from 22-0 down to defeat the Gold Coast 36-28.
In December, Isaako signed a three-year contract to play for the new Dolphins (NRL) side that would join the NRL competition in 2023.

2022

Isaako played one match and kicked two goals for the Brisbane Broncos at the start of 2022 NRL season. On 22 March, Isaako signed a one-year deal to join the Gold Coast for the remainder of the season.  It was initially believed that Isaako would sign a short-term contract with Parramatta but instead chose to sign with the Gold Coast club as he wanted to remain in Queensland prior to commencing with the Dolphins for their inaugural NRL season in 2023.
In round 10, Isaako scored the winning try for Gold Coast in their golden point victory over St. George Illawarra which ended a five-game losing streak.

2023

In round 1 of the 2023 NRL season, Isaako made his club debut for the Dolphins team on the wing in their inaugural game in the national competition. Isaako scored two tries and kicked four goals as the new club pulled off a major upset defeating the Sydney Roosters 28-18 at Suncorp Stadium. In round 2, Isaako kicked 4 goals in the Dolphins 20-14 defeat of the Canberra Raiders at Kayo Stadium. In round 3, Isaako scored two tries and kicked four goals in a 36-20 victory over the Newcastle Knights at McDonald Jones Stadium.

Career Stats

Personal life
On 26 October 2018, Isaako became a father after his partner Abby Sutherland, a legal secretary from Melbourne, gave birth to their son Isaiah Jamayne Isaako at Mater Mother's Hospital in South Brisbane, Australia.

References

External links
Dolphins Profile
Brisbane Broncos profile
Rugby League Project (summary)

1996 births
Living people
Brisbane Broncos players
Gold Coast Titans players
Dolphins (NRL) players
Junior Kiwis players
New Zealand rugby league players
New Zealand sportspeople of Samoan descent
New Zealand people of Tokelauan descent
New Zealand national rugby league team players
Rugby league fullbacks
Rugby league players from Christchurch
Rugby league wingers
Samoa national rugby league team players
Souths Logan Magpies players